VA-164, nicknamed the Ghostriders, was an Attack Squadron of the U.S. Navy. It was established on 1 September 1960 and disestablished on 12 December 1975.

Operational history
6 June 1962 embarked WestPac with USS Oriskany. October 1962 A4D-2s made nuclear weapon ready for launch during Cuban Missile Crisis. Returned San Diego 17 December 1962  - CAG-16 - - CVA 34 
November 1963: , with VA-164 embarked, operated in the South China Sea during a crisis in South Vietnam and the coup that overthrew President Diem.
5 May 1965: The squadron flew its first combat sortie. From May through July 1965, it flew close air support missions in South Vietnam.
7 November 1965: The squadron’s commanding officer, Commander J. D. Shaw, was awarded the Silver Star for successfully leading a strike against a SAM site in North Vietnam.
26 October 1966: A major fire broke out on Oriskany on Yankee Station. The squadron lost four officers in the fire. Several squadron personnel received awards for their heroic actions during the fire.
Hartman died in captivity
October 1967: Commander D. F. Mow, the squadron’s commanding officer, was awarded the Silver Star for his actions during a combat mission over North Vietnam.
March 1970: The squadron completed the last line period of its fifth combat deployment to Vietnam. This was the squadron’s first combat deployment without losing a pilot.
April 1972: The squadron participated in Operation Freedom Train, tactical air sorties against military and logistic targets in the southern part of North Vietnam. It also provided close air support for forces in South Vietnam following the Easter Offensive invasion by North Vietnam.
May 1972: Squadron aircraft participated in the early phase of Operation Linebacker, heavy air strikes against targets in North Vietnam.
August 1972: TA-4s acquired by VA-164 from the Marine Corps at MCAS Iwakuni were used for the first time operationally in a combat role from a carrier.
June 1973: Missions were flown in support of Operation End Sweep, the clearing of mines in the territorial waters of North Vietnam.
October 1973: With the outbreak of the Yom Kippur War , with VA-164 embarked, was directed to leave Yankee Station and operate in the Arabian Sea and Gulf of Aden.

Home port assignments
The squadron was assigned to these home ports, effective on the dates shown:
 NAS Cecil Field – 1 September 1960
 NAS Lemoore – 26 September 1961

Aircraft assignment
The squadron first received the following aircraft on the dates shown:
 A4D-2 Skyhawk – 7 October 1960
 A-4E Skyhawk – 13 March 1964
 A-4F Skyhawk – 6 April 1969
 TA-4F Skyhawk – 8 August 1972

See also
 List of squadrons in the Dictionary of American Naval Aviation Squadrons
 Attack aircraft
 List of inactive United States Navy aircraft squadrons
 History of the United States Navy

References

Attack squadrons of the United States Navy
Wikipedia articles incorporating text from the Dictionary of American Naval Aviation Squadrons